Legian is a suburban and beach area on the west coast of Bali in Indonesia, just north of Kuta and south of Seminyak, the area between Jl. Melasti and Jl. Dhyana Pura.  Administratively it is a district of Kuta District within Badung Regency.

References 

Beaches of Bali
Populated places in Bali
Badung Regency